The 1936 VPI Gobblers football team represented Virginia Agricultural and Mechanical College and Polytechnic Institute, now known as Virginia Tech, in the 1936 college football season. The team was led by their head coach Henry Redd and finished with a record of five wins and five losses (5–5). It finished with a 3–5 record in the Southern Conference. The Gobblers were shut out in all five of the games they lost. The team was 3-0 on its home field, Miles Stadium. It won three of its last four games, finishing the year beating arch-rival Virginia 7–6 at home, and winning the annual Thanksgiving Day contest against VMI at Maher Field in Roanoke.

Schedule

NFL Draft selections

Players

Roster

Varsity letter winners
Nineteen players received varsity letters for their participation on the 1936 VPI team.

References 

VPI
Virginia Tech Hokies football seasons
VPI Gobblers